A woozle is a fictional creature in the Winnie-the-Pooh stories.

Woozle may also refer to:
 Woozle, the supposed race of Jeff Dunham's puppet Peanut
 Woozle, the original name for the fraggle in Fraggle Rock
 Woozle, a manifestation of the Woozle effect or evidence by citation

See also
 Ouzel (disambiguation)